The European News Exchange (short: ENEX) is an association of the world’s leading commercial TV broadcasters. Coordinated by the ENEX Centre in Luxembourg, ENEX members share their news content and news production resources in order to gain competitive advantages in newsgathering. ENEX began as a technical service platform and has over recent years transformed itself into becoming a news provider that gathers daily news video stories from its members in a news pool. All ENEX content is available, exclusively to its members, for free. To ensure exclusivity, usually only one channel per territory is allowed to join.

History and Membership 

On 14 December 1993, managers from RTL Television, RTL Belgium, RTL Nederland, M6 in France, and corporate parent of the latter CLT (Compagnie Luxembourgeoise de Télédiffusion, later to become RTL Group) met in Luxembourg to found the European News Exchange. The initial goal was to combine the resources of the different TV channels and to reduce costs by sharing news footage, technical facilities and satellite space. ENEX started operating in 1994.

In 1996, ENEX merged with the "News Consortium" consisting of CBS, Sky News, VTM Belgium and TBS Japan. The members of the News Consortium joined ENEX, then operating one digital and one analogue satellite channel. Ten years after its inception, 30 ENEX members were making tens of thousands of bookings on 10 satellite channels and exchanging more than 5,000 news stories per year.

In 2003, ENEX digitised the picture exchange; all news stories were now recorded on a server. The following year, the number of items nearly doubled when footage from CBS Newspath was added. In 2005, ENEX introduced News Link, a system for the transmission and exchange of content via the internet on a file-sharing basis. Today [2022] ENEX has 55 members with more than 75 channels operating globally.  ENEX maintains 8 digital satellite channels on Eutelsat 16A. All ENEX members contribute and receive content from all over the world via News Link HD. In 2017 ENEX members delivered more than 40,000 items of video content.

Since 2014 ENEX has been rapidly expanding into new territories. It maintains very close cooperation with the Alianza Informativa Latinoamericana (AIL), a similar collaborative news organization in Latin America. ENEX, in 2018, had 14 Latin American partners. In 2015 ENEX began to expand into the Middle East where the partnership has four members.

The geographical reach and new expertise of its members contribute to the value of ENEX content exchange. ENEX strength is the collective strength of some of the world’s most important commercial and news channels.  They share live signals over the ENEX satellite and IP distribution network whenever there is breaking news, often being the first on the spot.  ENEX operates an MCR with highly developed links with LiveU and Mobile Viewpoint technologies, and also a grid of connections supported by R&S Relaycaster of Rohde & Schwarz. 

One of the most recent members is LNK, one of the major commercial TV channels in Lithuania. Since 2012, ENEX has expanded its membership base by 45 per cent. At present, the organization is in discussions with channels in Asia, Africa, additional partners in South America, as well as further partners in the Middle East and Central Asia.

ENEX's Managing Director is Adrian Wells; Head of News Mark Evans and Head of Finance and Business Operations Sime Jurlina.

Full list of ENEX members 
 CBS News (United States)
 Sky News (UK)
 RTL Television (Germany)
 RTL II (Germany)
 VOX (Germany)
 n-tv (Germany)
 M6 (France)
 RTL-TVI (Belgium)
 VTM (Belgium)
 SMG (China)
 SIC (Portugal)
 TBS (Japan)
 Telecinco (Spain)
 RTL 4 (Netherlands)
 TVN (Poland)
 TV2 (Norway)
 TV2 (Denmark) 
 MTV3 (Finland)
 TV4 (Sweden) 
 Channel 2 (Israel) 
 1+1 (Ukraine)
 RTL Télé Lëtzebuerg (Luxembourg)
 Antenna (Greece)
 Servus TV (Austria)
 RTL Klub (Hungary)
 RTL Televizija (Croatia)
 TV Nova (Czech Republic)
 Markiza (Slovakia)
 TV Azteca (Mexico)
 Caracol TV (Colombia)
 Ecuavisa (Ecuador) 
 BFM TV (France)
 LNK (Lithuania)
 Sky News Australia (Australia)
 Telefe (Argentina)
 Band (Brazil)
 bTV (Bulgaria)
 Unitel (Bolivia)
 Mega (Chile)
 Pro TV (Romania)
 NTV (Turkey)
 Al Arabiya (United Arab Emirates)
 Noticias Sin (Dominican Republic)
 Azteca Guatemala
 Rudaw (Iraq)
 Eco TV (Panama)
 Telefuturo (Paraguay)
  N1 Today (Bosnia and Herzegovina, Croatia, Serbia)
 POP TV (Slovenia)
 Telearuba (Aruba)
 TeleCuraçao (Curaçao)
 TVBS (Taiwan)
 Channel 2 (Iceland)
 TVC News (Nigeria)
 TeleOnce (Puerto Rico)
 Real TV (Azerbaijan)

Business model 

All ENEX members pay a yearly membership fee – the amount depends on the size of the channel, the size of its market, its contribution to the ENEX content pool, and the use of satellite time. Each member submits material from their own-produced news programmes to the ENEX content pool without receiving any financial compensation. In return, they can use all material from this pool for their programmes – free of charge. This way, it is possible to keep the membership fee low, resulting in significant cost savings for the channels compared to a classic agency model.

Live operations 

ENEX organises live stand-up coverage of major planned and breaking news events on behalf of partners. These services are designed to provide a more cost-effective way for members to cover significant stories when it is not possible or necessary for them to deploy their own live newsgathering operations.
The Greek financial crisis of summer 2015 saw ENEX deploying satellite trucks not only to Athens but also to each of the long-running string of governmental meetings in Brussels, Strasbourg and Luxembourg City such as Eurogroup, Ecofin and full council. The Germanwings plane crash saw ENEX have live camera positions in Seyne Les Alpes, France, Dusseldorf Airport and Haltern Am See in Germany. Over the course of the Charlie Hebdo tragedy, ENEX used three SNGs to provide positions in five locations, including the magazine’s offices on the first day and the Paris supermarket for the final hostage-freeing.
Pre-planned events have included the British royal wedding of the Duke and Duchess of Cambridge, the birth of their two children and the election of Pope Francis in 2013.

References 

RTL Group
Mass media companies of Luxembourg
Companies based in Luxembourg City
Pan-European media companies
Mass media companies established in 1994
Organizations established in 1994
1994 establishments in Luxembourg
1996 mergers and acquisitions